Events from the year 2013 in Sweden

Incumbents
 Monarch - Carl XVI Gustaf
 Prime Minister - Fredrik Reinfeldt

Events
 19 May 2013 Stockholm riots
 May 14–18: The Eurovision Song Contest 2013 is held in the Malmö Arena in Malmö. The winner is Danish singer Emmelie de Forest with her song Only Teardrops.
 16 October – Antje Jackelén is appointed the first female Church of Sweden archbishop.
 5 November - The leader of the Sweden Democrats Jimmie Åkesson is caked at a book signing on Nytorget, Södermalm in Stockholm.

Deaths

 5 January – Ann-Britt Leyman, athlete (b. 1922).
 5 January – Anders Carlberg, politician (b. 1943).
 8 February – Kjell Hjertsson, footballer (b. 1922).
 16 February – Eric Ericson, conductor (b. 1918).
 21 February –Hasse Jeppson, footballer (b. 1925).
 10 March – Princess Lilian, Duchess of Halland (b. 1915).
 21 March – Jörgen Ohlin, footballer (b. 1937).
 10 June – Petrus Kastenman, equestrian (b. 1924).

See also
 2013 in Swedish television

References

 
Years of the 21st century in Sweden
Sweden